Robert Evans (born ), better known by his stage names Sutter Kain and DJ Bless, is an American rapper and producer from Queens, New York. His productions range from traditional East Coast hip hop to ghetto metal, a style that samples metalcore. The name Sutter Kain is based on the character Sutter Cane from the 1995 horror film In the Mouth of Madness. He is the founder and owner of Never So Deep Records.

Career

Evans grew up in Rochdale Village, a housing development in South Jamaica, Queens, in New York City. He pursued music with his initial goal to become a battle DJ. He eventually left New York City and moved to the Carolinas.

In 2002, at the age of 18, Evans landed his first recording and distribution deal with MCA Records. In 2003, when MCA was merged into Geffen Records, he parted ways and focused on his own record label, Never So Deep Records. He restructured the business to control aspects of the label including music/video production, marketing, promotions, and distribution. Realizing that technology could play a major role in positioning his company, he took advantage of online distribution and social networking.

As DJ Bless, Evans has showcased his production skills with producers Kanye West, Scott Storch, Sean Combs, Swizz Beatz, Sha Money, Rick Rubin, Havoc, and R. Kelly. He produced the track "Tha Beehive" on Lil' Kim's album La Bella Mafia. In 2004–2005, he did high-profile remixes of Mystikal's "Pussy Pop", Dirt Bag's "I'll Leave You Dead", and Keith Murray and the Outlaws. In 2005–2006, he produced and mixed tracks on Czar-Nok's album That One Way. He produced music for the video game EA Sports Fight Night 2005. In 2008, he worked on the musical score of the docudrama Hoop Realities, which is a follow up to the documentary Hoop Dreams.

Never So Deep Records

Current artists
 DJ Bless aka Sutter Kain
 Donnie Darko
 Apollo Valdez
 Upon Oath 
 Daniel Gun

Former artists
 Swan The Truth (Agency 1994)
 Jim Snooka (aka Dirty Dickens)
 Hue Hef
 Insane Poetry

Style
Evans's style varies from traditional East Coast hip hop to more menacing extreme metal-based hip hop, the latter of which he calls ghetto metal and serves as the vehicle for his alter ego, Sutter Kain. DJ Bless's lyrics involve love, relationships, life and problems. In contrast, Sutter Kain's lyrics focus on taboo subjects such as torture, murder, and gore.

Discography

Studio albums 
 DJ Bless Presents Suicide Kingz, Vol. 1 (1998)
 DJ Bless Presents Suicide Kingz, Vol. 2 (2002)
 August Underground: Tha Making of Sutter Kain (2006)
 A Perfect Murder (2007)
 A Co-Dependent's Playlist (2011)
 Ghetto Metal King (2012)
 DeathStrumentals Vol. 1 (2012)

Singles

Producer

Sutter Kain and Donnie Darko
 The Darko Effect (2005) [Donnie Darko]
 Black Sunday (2005)
 Art of Tha Devil (2006) [Donnie Darko]
 Devil May Cry (2007) [Donnie Darko]
 As Death Takes Place (2010) [Donnie Darko]
 The Anxiety Theory (2010) [Donnie Darko]
 Black Sunday: Mask of the Demon (2011), produced as Black Sunday
 Emotional Disorder (2011)
 The Green Album (2012)
 Life Ep, Vol. 1 (2012)
 Redemption (2014) [Donnie Darko]
 Laugh Now Die Later (2015)

Agency 1.9.9.4
Evans teamed up with Swan The Truth to form the duo Agency 1.9.9.4, which released two albums:
 Dayz of Our Lives (2005)
 Real Life Isn't as Dope as the Movies (2006)

Pull The Fuckin' Trigger
Sutter Kain, Donnie Darko & Apollo Valdez
 Until it's My Time To Die (2018)

Never So Deep artists
 Pain by Infinity the Ghetto Child (2002)
 Tha Carolina Spokesman by Hue Hef (2006)
 Sutter Kain Presents Cyco the Snuff Reels by Insane Poetry (2008)
 "Help" single by Jim Snooka (2009)
 The Gospels of Reverend Wallace by Jim Snooka (2009)
 Dreaming Up Nightmares While the World Sleeps by Sabotawj (2010)
 Runaway Train of Thought EP by McNastee (2012)
 Way Of The Gun (2015) Album by Daniel Gun & Sutter Kain

Other collaborations
 "Tha Beehive" by Lil' Kim (2003)
 "Pussy Pop (Remix)" by Mystikal (2004)
 "The Essence" (12-inch single) by Choclair (2009)
 K-Ci & Jojo Come Clean theme music (2010)
 "T-Dot" by Choclair (2011)

Notes

References

External links
 

Living people
Year of birth missing (living people)
Masked musicians
African-American rappers
Underground rappers
People from Queens, New York
Rappers from New York City
Horrorcore artists
21st-century American rappers
21st-century African-American musicians